Maureen S. Gray (May 10, 1948 – January 7, 2014) was an American songwriter and doo-wop singer, guitarist and keyboardist.

She was born in 1948 in Queens, New York. Gray, a child prodigy, at age five made her first public appearance in Carnegie Hall in Midtown Manhattan in New York City, singing "Steam Heat" from the musical The Pajama Game, and received a positive critical acclaim. At age 12, she performed at Mount Zion Baptist Church in Glassboro, New Jersey in a concert along with her mother.

Gray was discovered by record producer and singer-songwriter John Medera 
Regionally she released singles written by the team John Madara –David White. Among them were recorded with Chancellor Records "Today’s The Day", "Crazy Over You", "I Don’t Want To Cry" and the Billboard Hot 100 chart hit "Dancing The Strand". She recorded a few singles for Mercury Records, among them "Goodbye Baby".

She resided for a few years in London, England where she recorded and performed with David Bowie, George Harrison and John Lennon, to name a few.

Gray died in Philadelphia, Pennsylvania on January 7, 2014, from a rare form of bile duct cancer at age 65.

References

1948 births
2014 deaths
Doo-wop musicians